Tillman is an unincorporated community in Stoddard County, in the U.S. state of Missouri.

History
A variant spelling was "Tilman". A post office called Tilman was established in 1883, and remained in operation until 1906. The community has the name of John Tilman, proprietor of a local sawmill.

References

Unincorporated communities in Stoddard County, Missouri
Unincorporated communities in Missouri
1883 establishments in Missouri
Populated places established in 1883